Olli Ilmari Rehn (born 31 March 1962) is a Finnish economist and public official who has been serving as governor of the Bank of Finland since 2018. A member of the Centre Party, he previously served as the European Commissioner for Enlargement from 2004 to 2010, European Commissioner for Economic and Monetary Affairs and the Euro from 2010 to 2014, and Minister of Economic Affairs in Juha Sipilä's cabinet from 2015 until 2016.

Early life and education
Born in Mikkeli in Eastern Finland, Rehn studied economics, international relations, and journalism at Macalester College in Saint Paul, Minnesota, in the United States. He gained a master's degree in political science from the University of Helsinki in 1989, and a D.Phil. from St. Antony's College, Oxford in 1996 on the subject of "Corporatism and Industrial Competitiveness in Small European States". In addition to his native Finnish and German he speaks English, French, Swedish, and some Russian, Polish and Hungarian.

Rehn also played football for his hometown club Mikkelin Palloilijat in Finland's top division Mestaruussarja (now Veikkausliiga) in his youth.

Finnish politics
He began his political career in youth politics as a regular member of the Finnish Centre Youth and soon became the secretary general of the Nordic Centre Youth. In 1987, he was elected as the president of the Finnish Centre Youth. That position can be seen as predicting high political responsibilities in Finnish politics.

In 1988 Rehn was elected as a city councillor in Helsinki. He was vice president of the Centre Party from 1988 to 1994, having been president of its youth wing from 1987. Elected to the Finnish Parliament in 1991, Rehn led the Finnish delegation to the Parliamentary Assembly of the Council of Europe, and was a special adviser to the Finnish Prime Minister Esko Aho from 1992 to 1993. He left the Finnish Parliament in 1995 to become an MEP, aligned to the liberal group. He was, however, not re-elected in the 1996 election.

He was briefly the chairman of Veikkausliiga from 1996 to 1997. From 1998 to 2002 Rehn ran the office of Erkki Liikanen, Finland's representative on the Prodi Commission. Rehn would later succeed Liikanen in the role of commissioner for Enterprise and Information Society. In 2002, he left European politics for the University of Helsinki, where he led the Centre for European Studies. In 2003, he became an adviser to the prime minister on economic policy, a position he held until his appointment to the European Commission the following year.

European Commission

Rehn served briefly on the Prodi Commission. He was appointed European commissioner for enterprise and information society on 12 July 2004, taking over the role from the previous Finnish commissioner Erkki Liikanen, who left his post the same day to become governor of the Bank of Finland. The Finnish government nominated Rehn for the incoming Barroso Commission, which took office on 22 November 2004. He was the youngest member of the first Barroso Commission.

Rehn's appointment to the enlargement post was seen as a slight disappointment for Finland, who had hoped for their nominee to be given a portfolio relating to economic issues. Enlargement was a central issue for the EU in the run-up to the landmark accession of ten countries on 1 May 2004, but has since declined in importance, if only slightly. Rehn presided over the accession of Bulgaria and Romania in 2007, as well as continuing negotiations with Croatia and opening them with Turkey, the latter being perhaps the most significant and the most hotly debated future accession.

Rehn favours Turkish membership but has controversially suggested permanent restrictions on the free movement of workers from Turkey, "in case serious disturbances occur in the labour market within the EU as a result of Turkey’s accession", an attitude seen by some as running counter to the whole purpose and spirit of the EU. He has stressed the importance of greater respect for human rights and civil liberties as preconditions for Turkey's entry, while acknowledging the advances it had already made in this respect.

Siim Kallas was twice acting commissioner in his stead, from 19 April 2014 to 25 May 2014 while he was on electoral campaign leave for the 2014 elections to the European Parliament and from 1 July 2014 – 16 July 2014 after he took up his seat.

Selection hearing
Questioned by the European Parliament, Rehn offered his thoughts on the prospects for accession of each of the countries highest on the enlargement agenda. He praised Turkey for the human rights advances it had made but said he would advocate stronger monitoring if the decision was taken to open accession talks by the European Council when it considered the question in December.

Asked about free movement of Turkish labour after the country's accession, Rehn expressed the view that there should be "considerable transitional periods as well as a permanent safeguard clause". He was cautious on the question of the inevitability of Turkish membership, stating that he did not "believe in historic determinism", but that if negotiations were begun, "underpinned by the commitment that [Turkey] will be able to join [the EU] once it fulfils all conditions, it will join as soon as it does meet the conditions".

He insisted that Bulgaria and Romania would be judged on their merits and that he would not hesitate to delay accession by a year if the EU's requirements were not met on time. He considered the establishment of a pre-accession strategy for the Western Balkans one of his prime tasks.

European sovereign debt crisis

In late June 2011, Rehn spoke out on austerity measures being considered by the Greek parliament, saying, "The only way to avoid immediate default is for parliament to endorse the revised economic program...The program includes both the medium-term fiscal strategy and the privatization program. They must be approved if the next tranche of financial assistance [a 12 billion euro aid payment] is to be released...To those who speculate about other options, let me say this clearly: there is no Plan B to avoid default".

In May 2012, coincident with warnings from Mario Draghi of the ECB, Rehn said that even if Eurobonds "were ever approved, it would still not be sufficient to save the euro. The single currency’s members needed 'a genuine stability culture and a much upgraded common capacity to contain common contagion', if they wanted to avoid a disintegration of the eurozone and if they wanted it to survive".

Rehn has continued to maintain that the only way out of the crisis is a continued programme of fiscal austerity. Economist Paul Krugman has been critical of this stance, saying in early 2013 that Olli Rehn, and the economic management of the European Commission, had been proven disastrously wrong in their predictions and management since the beginning of the crisis. He noted, "European leaders seem determined to learn nothing, which makes this more than a tragedy; it’s an outrage." Krugman maintains that Rehn's focus on fiscal discipline is in fact an excuse to dismantle the social safety net and reduce the size of government, as he has criticized countries, such as France which have tried to achieve fiscal discipline through tax increases.

In mid-2013, Rehn claimed that the European Commission was following a pragmatic policy balancing austerity policies with pro-growth policies and that much of the criticism was unfair.

Member of the European Parliament, 2014–2015
Rehn was a candidate in the 2014 European election and was elected MEP. In the European Parliament he was elected to be one of the parliament's 14 vice presidents.

Return to Finnish politics

Minister of Economic Affairs, 2015–2016
In 2015, Rehn was elected in the Finnish parliamentary election with 6,837 votes. His term in the European Parliament ended on 27 April, when Rehn officially accepted the seat in the Finnish Parliament. On 29 May 2015, Rehn was appointed the Minister of Economic Affairs in Sipilä Cabinet. During his time in office, he oversaw the country's emergence from a three-year recession thanks to a combination of tax and spending cuts. He also played a key role in persuading labor unions to agree to pay cuts to restore competitiveness.

Bank of Finland, 2016–present
On 14 October 2016, Rehn was selected to the board of the Bank of Finland. In this capacity, he is in charge of  monetary policy implementation and investment of the Bank of Finland's financial assets. He is also responsible for the bank's digitalisation process and for the activities of the Financial Supervisory Authority, where he is chairman of the board. He continued as a minister and MP  till the end of 2016.

Following the resignation of Christine Lagarde as managing director of the International Monetary Fund (IMF) in 2019, Rehn was one of the candidates considered by European governments as potential successor; he withdrew his candidacy shortly after and the post went to Kristalina Georgieva instead.

Other activities

International organizations
 European Central Bank (ECB), ex officio member of the governing council
 European Systemic Risk Board (ESRB), ex officio member
 International Monetary Fund (IMF), ex officio alternate member of the board of governors
 European Bank for Reconstruction and Development (EBRD), ex officio member of the board of governors (2010–2014)

Non-profit organizations
 Women Political Leaders Global Forum (WPL), member of the global advisory board
 World Economic Forum (WEF), member of the Europe Policy Group (since 2017)
 World Economic Forum (WEF), chairman of the Global Agenda Council on Public Finance and Social Protection Systems
 World Economic Forum (WEF), member of the Global Future Council on the Future of Financial and Monetary Systems
 Trilateral Commission, member of the European Group
 Academy of European Law (ERA), member of the board of trustees

Personal life
Rehn is married with one child.

After launching his political career Rehn did not give up football but has played for the teams of both the Finnish parliament and the European Commission. With the Finnish parliament team, he twice helped to win the European championship of parliaments in the early 1990s.

His mother was Vuokko Rehn.

Awards 

: Commander Grand Cross of the Order of the Lion of Finland (2014)
: 2nd Class of the Order of the Cross of Terra Mariana (2011)
: Commander (3rd Class) of Order of the Three Stars (October 2014)
 Finnish Expat of the Year (2011, Suomi Seura Society)

References

External links

Official personal website (in Finnish)
Olli Rehn Official Media Gallery
Official EC website with speech links
Interview with Olli Rehn, 26 February 2003, part of the Conversations with History series from the Institute of International Studies, UC Berkeley

|-

|-

|-

|-

|-

1962 births
Living people
Alumni of St Antony's College, Oxford
Association footballers not categorized by position
Centre Party (Finland) politicians
Finnish European Commissioners
Finnish footballers
Governors of the Bank of Finland
Members of the Parliament of Finland (1991–95)
Members of the Parliament of Finland (2015–19)
MEPs for Finland 2014–2019
Ministers of Trade and Industry of Finland
University of Helsinki alumni
People from Mikkeli
Recipients of the Order of the Cross of Terra Mariana, 2nd Class